is a passenger railway station located in the city of Chigasaki, Kanagawa Prefecture, Japan, operated by the East Japan Railway Company (JR East).

Lines

Station layout
The station consists of a single side platform serving one bi-directional track. The station is staffed.

History
Kagawa Station was opened on September 28, 1921, as a station the Sagami Railway. On June 1, 1944, the Sagami Railway was nationalized and merged with the Japan National Railways. On April 1, 1987, with the dissolution and privatization of the Japan National Railways, the station came under the operation of JR East. Automated turnstiles using the Suica IC card system came into operation from November 2001.

Passenger statistics
In fiscal 2019, the station was used by an average of 5,709 passengers daily (boarding passengers only).

The passenger figures (boarding passengers only) for previous years are as shown below.

Surrounding area
Chigasaki City Hall Kagawa Branch Office
Kayagasaki Satoyama Park
Chigasaki New Hokuryo Hospital
Nagaoka Hospital
Kanagawa Prefectural Chigasaki Hokuryo High School
Bunkyo University Shonan Campus

See also
List of railway stations in Japan

References

External links

JR East Station Information

Railway stations in Japan opened in 1921
Railway stations in Kanagawa Prefecture
Sagami Line
Chigasaki, Kanagawa